Şükürbəyli (also, Shukurbeyli) is a village in the Jabrayil District of Azerbaijan. Currently uninhabited.

References 

Populated places in Jabrayil District